Sevis (also Romanized as Sevīs; also known as Seh Bīs) is a village in Jereh Rural District, Jereh and Baladeh District, Kazerun County, Fars Province, Iran. At the 2006 census, its population was 127, in 33 families.

References 

Populated places in Kazerun County